Seven Secrets is the second studio album by North Irish progressive rock band Fruupp, released on 19 April 1974 in the United Kingdom on the Dawn Records label, a subsidiary of Pye Records for underground and progressive rock music. Like the band's debut album, it was recorded at Escape Studios in Egerton, Kent, but was this time produced by David Lewis, the frontman of another North Irish rock band Andwella.

Before Fruupp entered the recording studio, they had written six songs, but felt that the album name "Seven Secrets" would be more appropriate than "Six Secrets", so Vincent McCusker composed an acoustic guitar and spoken song "The Seventh Secret" to ensure the album had seven tracks to match its new title.

Track listing

Personnel

Fruupp
Peter Farrelly – lead vocals, bass guitar; cover artwork
Stephen Houston – keyboards, oboe, vocals
Vincent McCusker – guitars, vocals
Martin Foye – drums, percussion

Technical personnel
David Lewis – producer; piano on "Three Spires"
Tony Taverner – engineer
Michael Rennie – conductor (strings)
Ruby Mazur – photography, design
Ian Stokes – photography, design

References

Fruupp albums
1974 albums